Susan Meekins Sullivan (born December 24, 1946) is an American politician.

Sullivan was born in Mountain View, Anchorage, a neighborhood in Anchorage, Alaska Territory. Sullivan graduated from Anchorage High School in 1965 and received her bachelor's degree in business and economics from Alaska Methodist University in 1970. She also went to University of Alaska for pre-elementary education in 1972 and was involved with the land law business. Sullivan served in the Alaska House of Representatives in 1975 and 1976 and was a Democrat. Her father Russ Meekins Sr. and her brother Russ Meekins Jr. also served in the Alaska State Legislature.

Notes

1946 births
Living people
Politicians from Anchorage, Alaska
Alaska Pacific University alumni
University of Alaska alumni
Women state legislators in Alaska
Democratic Party members of the Alaska House of Representatives
21st-century American women